In enzymology, an ethanolaminephosphotransferase is an enzyme that catalyzes the chemical reaction

CDP-ethanolamine + 1,2-diacylglycerol  CMP + a phosphatidylethanolamine

Thus, the two substrates of this enzyme are CDP-ethanolamine and 1,2-diacylglycerol, whereas its two products are CMP and phosphatidylethanolamine.

This enzyme belongs to the family of transferases, specifically those transferring non-standard substituted phosphate groups.  The systematic name of this enzyme class is CDP-ethanolamine:1,2-diacylglycerol ethanolaminephosphotransferase. Other names in common use include EPT, diacylglycerol ethanolaminephosphotransferase, CDPethanolamine diglyceride phosphotransferase, and phosphorylethanolamine-glyceride transferase.  This enzyme participates in 3 metabolic pathways: aminophosphonate metabolism, glycerophospholipid metabolism, and ether lipid metabolism.

References

 

EC 2.7.8
Enzymes of unknown structure